Vladislav Jelínek-Jelen was a Czech footballer who played as a midfielder.

Club career
During his playing career, Jelínek played for Smíchov.

International career
On 1 April 1906, Jelínek made his debut for Bohemia in Bohemia's second game, starting in a 1–1 draw against Hungary. Jelínek would later make two more appearances for Bohemia.

Notes

References

Date of birth unknown
Date of death unknown
Association football midfielders
Czech footballers
Czechoslovak footballers
Bohemia international footballers